Papa Stronsay is a small island in Orkney, Scotland, lying north east of Stronsay. After being largely abandoned, the island was bought at the end of the 20th century by traditionalist Catholic monks of the Sons of the Most Holy Redeemer, who operate a monastery and farm there.

According to folklore, some of the natives were descended from a female selkie. This was because they had horny skin on their feet and hands, and permanently smelt of fish.

Geography and geology
The geology is middle old red sandstone.

A thin tongue of land curls west from the main part of the island, and then south to form the Point of the Graand (a local word meaning a "sandbar"). The island in general is low lying, reaching a mere  at its highest point.

There is an  light beacon in the north east.

History
The island has remains of two chapels. One dates from the eleventh century, and an eighth-century Pictish monastery may lie under it. It has been described as the most northerly early Christian monastery ever found.  Other remains include cairns and a burnt mound, and a number of abandoned crofts.

The island is one of the "Papeys" or "islands of the papar". Joseph Anderson noted that:

The Orkneyinga saga recalls in Chapter XXXIV that Earl Rögnvald was killed on Papa Stronsay in 1046:

Everyone agrees that of all the Earls of Orkney Rögnvald Brusason was the most popular and gifted, and his death was mourned by many (Orkneyinga saga Ch. XXIX).

Earl's Knowle on Papa Stronsay is traditionally thought to be the final resting place of Sir Patrick Spens. His burial there is related by William Edmonstoune Aytoun (1813–1865), who after his retirement as Sheriff and Lord Admiral of Orkney and Shetland edited a collection of Scottish poetry. In his forward to the ballad about Spens, Aytoun wrote:

A fertile island, it became an important centre for the curing of herring in the eighteenth century, but was abandoned in the 1970s.

Present day

In 1999, the island was purchased from farmer Charles Ronald Smith by the monastic community of the Sons of the Most Holy Redeemer, a traditionalist Catholic religious congregation formerly affiliated with the Society of St. Pius X. In 2008 the congregation, along with most of its members, was received into full communion with the Holy See. Monks at the Golgotha Monastery, which has a working farm, hail from as far afield as Australia, Samoa, South Africa and Poland. The ancient monastic ruins dating back to the 7th and 8th centuries mark Papa Stronsay as a holy island and the intention is to rebuild them.

In 2001 the island had a recorded population of 10 although by 2011 there were no "usual residents" living there as recorded by the census.  a dozen monks live there.

See also

 List of lighthouses in Scotland
 List of Northern Lighthouse Board lighthouses
 Papa, Scotland, a list of islands named after the papar.

References

External links
 Death of Rognvald
 Golgotha monastery
 Youtube documentary on Golgotha monastery.
 Northern Lighthouse Board 

Uninhabited islands of Orkney